David Anthony McAuley, MBE (born 15 June 1961, Larne) is a former professional boxer from Northern Ireland who competed from 1983 to 1992. He held the IBF flyweight title from 1989 to 1992 and challenged twice for the WBA flyweight title, in 1987 and 1988. At regional level, he held the British flyweight title in 1986.

Boxing career
McAuley fought under the name Dave "Boy" McAuley and was one of the last Irish boxers to fight for a world title over 15 rounds. His two bouts with Fidel Bassa of Colombia were each voted "Fight of the Year", in 1986 and 1987 respectively. On 7 June 1989, McAuley defeated Duke McKenzie for the IBF title at Wembley Arena, London.

He successfully defended his title five times, eventually losing it in 1992 to Rodolfo Blanco, whom he had beaten two years previously.

McAuley was unusual for a flyweight in that he was extremely tall, standing at 5'7".

Professional boxing record

See also
List of Irish sportspeople

References

1961 births
Living people
Male boxers from Northern Ireland
Flyweight boxers
People from Larne
International Boxing Federation champions
Members of the Order of the British Empire
Irish male boxers